Étienne Payot (July 27, 1900 – July 18, 1972) was a French bobsledder who competed in the mid-1930s. At the 1936 Winter Olympics in Garmisch-Partenkirchen, he was listed in the four-man event, but did not compete.

References
1936 bobsleigh four-man results
1936 Olympic Winter Games official report. - p. 416.
Étienne Payot's profile at Sports Reference.com

Bobsledders at the 1936 Winter Olympics
Olympic bobsledders of France
French male bobsledders
1900 births
1972 deaths